Krisia Marinova Todorova  (born 1 June 2004) is a Bulgarian singer, composer and songwriter. Along with Ignatov Brothers, she represented Bulgaria at the Junior Eurovision Song Contest 2014 in Malta with her song "Planet of the Children". They finished in second place, however, they won the press voting.

The following year she performed "Discover", the Junior Eurovision Song Contest 2015 official song, in Arena Armeec, Sofia., and again "Planet of the Children" and "I'd like to draw a dream" at "New Wave Junior", 2015, Sochi, Russian Federation. Also, in the year 2015, Todorova and the Seven-Eight Production Company received the NASO Grand Prize for their contribution to the social development of Bulgaria.

Early and personal life
Born in Varna on 1 June 2004, Todorova now lives in Razgrad. Her father is Marin Todorov and her mother is Angelina Todorova. She has two sisters, Tiffany Todorova (born 2000) and Marina Todorova (2009). She started studying music when she was six years old in different music schools in Bulgaria, and is currently studying music at the "Centre for work with Children" in Razgrad with vocal teacher Svilena Decheva, where she sings and plays the piano. She studied at "Vasil Levski" Primary School in 7200 Razgrad, and since 15 September 2018 she is a student of the National School of Music "Lyubomir Pipkov" in Sofia.

Her hobbies include drawing and dancing – especially classical ballet. Her favourite subject at school is Mathematics, Man And Society and the English language. Her favourite singers are Ariana Grande, Lili Ivanova, Lara Fabian, Mariana Popova, Celine Dion, Christina Aguilera and Beyoncé.

Career

Todorova has received seven awards from different national and international music competitions held in Bulgaria, but 2014 was her major breakthrough year. She gained national popularity with her participation in Slavi's Show on bTV, and later became part of the TV show – Zapoznaĭ se s malkite (Meet the Kids). Todorova first appeared on the show on 30 December 2013, performing "Listen" by Beyoncé.
In March 2014, Todorova was chosen to sing the national anthem of Bulgaria, Mila Rodino and Moya Strana, Moya Bălgaria at the Vasil Levski National Stadium in Sofia, live in front of 42,000 people, for the opening of the UEFA Europa League Round of 16 match between Bulgarian side Ludogorets Razgrad and Spanish club Valencia.

In November 2014, Todorova along with twins Hasan and Ibrahim represented Bulgaria at the Junior Eurovision Song Contest 2014 in Malta with the song "Planet of the Children". They finished in second place with a total of 147 points, just twelve points behind winner Italy. Todorova was subsequently received by President Rosen Plevneliev and was given an honorary distinction. In December 2014, Krisia performed again "The Planet of the Children" at the European Parliament. In March 2016, Fab Chart Music Awards in London nominated Todorova for the "Best Female Artist." Todorova has modeled for Junona Fashion House. From the year 2015, with the help of the music and her popularity, Krisia Todorova is in Bulgaria, one of the "spiritual leaders" of the country. From the year 2018, Krisia Todorova is an expert panel member of the EURO-PANEL.

Discography

References

External links

 Official Facebook page
 Krisia Todorova in Slavi's Show – Official videos
 Participant profile of JUNIOR EUROVISION SONG CONTEST 2014
 bTV Interview Bulgarian TV, Interview with Krisia Todorova
  "120 Minutes" – TV "120 Minutes" / Bulgarian TV, 4. Feb. 2018, Interview with Krisia Todorova

2004 births
Living people
Musicians from Varna, Bulgaria
21st-century Bulgarian women singers
Bulgarian child singers
Junior Eurovision Song Contest entrants
People from Razgrad
English-language singers from Bulgaria